Chirosathi is a 2008 Bengali romance drama film directed by Haranath Chakraborty and starring Hiran and Koyel Mullick.

Plot
Raju an orphan youngster brought up by his aunt Namita. He falls in love with Riya Roy, the daughter of business tycoon Mahendra Roy. They meet at their college excursion, and after that initial tiffs and estrangement. They fall madly in love. While Mahendra Roy already zeroes in on getting Riya's married to Dhiman (the son of another business biggie Mr. Mohim), Raju arrives at Riya's residence in disguise with the help of Mahendra Roy's estranged young brother Pratap Roy. Within days Raju gets success by associating with Riya's joint family. But the conservative, chauvinist and patriarchal Mahendra Roy shifts bad and constantly sends negative vibes towards Raju in a passive way. In the meantime the spoilt brat Dhiman takes Riya to a pub and insults her to get beaten up by an avenging Raju. Without knowing the truth Mahendra Roy expels Raju from his house. Raju meanwhile reveals that his elder brother Apurva who has become insane incidentally loved Riya's elder sister and Mahendra's elder daughter Priya (she committed suicide). In the end Mahendra understands Dhiman's nature and the lovers unite gleefully.

Cast
 Hiran as Raju
 Koel Mallick as Riya
 Deepankar De as Mahendra Roy
 Nimu Bhowmik as Sir
 Bhaswar Chattopadhyay as Dhiman
 Sumeet Ganguly as Johnny
 Pratim Chattopadhyay as Mohim Babu
 Anamika Saha as Dhiman's Mother
 Master Writorshi as Rinku (Introducing)

References

External links
 https://web.archive.org/web/20110718151923/http://www.zeemotionpictures.com/regional-begali-chirasathi.htm
 www.telegraphindia.com preview

2008 films
Bengali-language Indian films
2000s Bengali-language films
2008 drama films
Indian romantic drama films
Films directed by Haranath Chakraborty